Yosef Guez (born 1860 in Sousse, died 1934), also known as Youssef Guez and Youssef el Guidj, was a Grand Rabbi of Tunisia. He served in Sousse (1906-1928) then in Tunis (1928-1934) where he served as Grand Rabbi of Tunisia until his death.

Biography
Guez was the grandson of the namesake Rabbi Yosef Guez, whose name he received according to the Sephardic tradition. He is the son of Rabbi Chaim David Guez and a direct descendant of the Chief Rabbi David Guez who was a Talmudist of North Africa. He belongs to a rabbinical dynasty dating back at least to the 17th century.  
He founded the synagogue Keter Torah (כתר תורה), now the only synagogue in Sousse.

Some stories were collected about him and his life in 1990.

Works
He was the author of several books and manuscripts, including:
 A collection of halachic decisions that was published in 2008: Yagen HaShem;
 1931 - A manual of preparation for the Bar Mitzvah of the Grand Rabbinate of Tunis.
1903-1908 - יקרא דשכבי  Sermons on the deceased by Rabbi Sermons on the deceased by Rabbi Yosef Gaz during his tenure in the cities of Mahdia and Susa in the years 1903-1908.

Honours
He was decorated by the French President Gaston Doumergue, Knight of the Legion of Honor in 1929.

Notes

References
 AIU, http://www.library-numerical-us.int/idurl/1/11056 [archive].
 Diarna.org, 'Synagogue Keter Torah, Sousse, TUunisia', http://archive.diarna.org/site/detail/public/2758/.
 El Ghriba Association, Jerusalem. Tunisian Jewish Communities (El Ghriba Association of Jerusalem) [archive].
 fr Hillel Bakis (2000), Le fil du temps. Contes et récits juifs d'Afrique du Nord, Vol. 1, Traditions et vie quotidienne, A.J. Presse, Les Lilas. See tales: 39, 46 et 53. (The thread of time. Jewish tales and stories from North Africa, Vol. 1, Traditions and dayly life).
 ATJ (1928), 'Mr. Yossef Guez, New Chief Rabbi of Tunis', Archive of the Jewish Telegraphic Agency, July 20. https://www.jta.org/1928/08/10/archive/m-yossef-guez-new-chief-rabbi- of-tunis [archive].
 National Library of Israel, System information, Catalog: No. 002719130 and 002725536.

1860 births
1934 deaths
Chevaliers of the Légion d'honneur
Chief rabbis of Tunisia